is a type of Japanese multi-coloured woodblock printing; the technique is used primarily in ukiyo-e. It was invented in the 1760s, and perfected and popularized by the printmaker Suzuki Harunobu, who produced many nishiki-e prints between 1765 and his death five years later.

Previously, most prints had been in black-and-white, coloured by hand, or coloured with the addition of one or two colour ink blocks. A nishiki-e print is created by carving a separate woodblock for every colour, and using them in a stepwise fashion. An engraver by the name of Kinroku is credited with the technical innovations that allowed so many blocks of separate colours to fit together perfectly on the page, in order to create a single complete image.

Edo Era 
Nishiki-e is also known as Edo-e, or azuma-nishiki-e. The technology to produce nishiki-e made printing complex colors and figures easy. It became a popular commodity during Edo period. Due to the increasing number of nishiki-e shops during the era, the price of a nishiki-e dropped to an affordable 16 to 32 mon.

Meiji Era 
In the Meiji period, various nishiki-e illustrated new fashions, imported goods, events, the railroad, and other new topics. "Newspaper nishiki-e" (新聞錦絵, shinbun nishiki-e) were very popular among the public during this period. Print designers created nishiki-e on topics picked up from the newspapers such as Tōkyō Nichinichi Shinbun or Yūbin Hōchi Shinbun.

Woodblock prints soared in popularity during the first Sino-Japanese War (1894–1895), with 3,000 prints produced during this 9-month period. These prints generally glorified the Japanese army while denigrating the Chinese. And the bright colours in the prints, exciting scenes, and inexpensive nature made them a good alternative to the black and white photographs of the time.

Taisho Era 
Some of the most well-known printmakers in Taisho Period include Yamamoto Noboru, Ohara Kofun, and Sakamaki Kogyo. Overall, the amount of Nishiki-e print production decreased greatly in comparison to Meiji Period.

References 

 Forbes, Andrew ; Henley, David (2012). Suzuki Harunobu: 100 Beauties. Chiang Mai: Cognoscenti Books. ASIN: B00AC2NB8Y
 Munsterberg, Hugo (1957). "The Arts of Japan: An Illustrated History." Tokyo: Charles E. Tuttle Company.
 Paine, Robert Treat and Alexander Soper (1955). "The Art and Architecture of Japan." New Haven: Yale University Press.

External links 

 Ukiyo-e Caricatures 1842–1905 Database of the Department of East Asian Studies of the University of Vienna. All pictures of the database are nishiki-e.
Nishiki-e collection from Edo-Tokyo Museum

Relief printing
Ukiyo-e genres
1760s in art
History of art in Japan